Pontocyprididae is a family of ostracods belonging to the order Podocopida.

Genera

Genera:
 Abyssocypris Bold, 1974
 Aratrocypris Whatley, Ayress, Downing, Harlow & Kesler, 1985
 Argilloecia Sars, 1866

References

Ostracods